The Ditchers or Diehards were groupings of British nobility, so called because they were prepared to engage in a "last-ditch" stand against the Liberal government's reforms to the constitution.

1911 Act
Many of the nobility were determined to prevent Chancellor of the Exchequer David Lloyd George's Parliament Act 1911. The Lords had blocked the Supply Bill, the so-called People's budget of 1909, which Lloyd George had introduced to increase taxation, and increase welfarism. The Parliament Act 1911 was introduced to curb the powers of the House of Lords. Despite opposition it went through, after threats were made by the Liberal Government that they would advise the King to pack the Lords with 500 new Liberal Peers, which he would have difficulty in refusing under constitutional measures in place, despite the obvious outrageous behaviour of the government. It presented a fait accompli to the Lords by removing their 900 year-old right to block Bills coming up from the House of Commons. No longer could the Lords forestall legislation. The new power to delay was restricted to a period of two years only.

Many of the "Last Ditchers" or "Die-Hards" were Tory farmers, landowners, and aristocracy, who opposed the social 'equalitarian' reforms made by Liberal Governments in government and the judiciary since at least 1880, eroding the traditional political power that went with aristocratic social superiority.  The inexorable rise of business and merchant middle-class capitalists in the second half of the nineteenth century appeared to reach a climax during the Edwardian era.  Their entry into the Commons, assisted by the enfranchisement of the working-classes in the 1884-5 Reform Acts, had already marked a significant shift of power.

References

 Phillips, Gregory D., The Diehards - Aristocratic Society and Politics in Edwardian England, Harvard University Press and London, England, 1979. 

Political history of the United Kingdom